Coagulation is the process by which blood forms clots.

Coagulation may also refer to:
 Coagulation (water treatment), in colloid chemistry, a process in which dispersed colloidal particles agglomerate 
 Coagulation (milk), the coagulation of milk into curd by rennet or acid
 Coagulation, the loss of solubility as a result of denaturation 
 Blood Gulch, a multiplayer map called "Coagulation" in the video game Halo 2
 Mixing of two particles in an aerosol to form a third particle
 Clumping of dust particles in a protoplanetary disk, a possible early stage of planet formation